Russell Holman Willis (January 12, 1880 – August 9, 1954) was an American Democratic politician who served as a member of the Virginia Senate and Virginia House of Delegates. He was majority floor leader of the latter from 1916 until his election to the Senate. he died at age 74 in Roanoke Virginia

References

External links
 
 

1880 births
1954 deaths
Democratic Party Virginia state senators
University of Richmond alumni
20th-century American politicians
People from Marshall, Missouri
Politicians from Roanoke, Virginia